Jonathan Friedman (born April 7, 1946) is an American anthropologist. He earned his Ph.D. at Columbia University in 1972. He is professor emeritus of Anthropology at University of California, San Diego and Director of Studies at the École des hautes études en sciences sociales. He is an editorial board member of the journal Anthropological Theory. Friedman has done most of his research in Hawaii and the Republic of Congo.

Current research 
 Dynamics of tribal societies,
 Cultural identity and global processes,
 Global systemic anthropology,
 Transformation of the nation state,
 Multiculturalism and migration,
 Upland Southeast Asia,
 Oceania.

Publications 
System, structure and contradiction in the evolution of "Asiatic" social formations, National Museum of Copenhagen, 1979   [+ 2nd edition: Altamira Press 1998, with a new foreword] with Scott Lash(eds) Modernity and identity, Blackwell, Oxford, 1992
Consumption and Identity. London: Harwood Academic Press, 1994

The anthropology of global systems: Modernities, class and the contradictions of globalization. Walnut Creek: Altamira Press 2007

External links 
 IRIS Institute at the EHESS (Official site)
 UCSD Anthropology Faculty

References 

Living people
1946 births
American anthropologists
University of San Diego faculty
Columbia University alumni